The Men’s Singles tournament (the Rome Masters) of the 1977 Italian Open tennis championships took place in Rome between 16 May and 1 July 1977. 64 players from 19 countries competed in the 6-round tournament. The final winner was Vitas Gerulaitis of the USA, who defeated Antonio Zugarelli of Italy. The defending champion from 1976, Adriano Panatta of Italy, was eliminated in the quarter-finals by Gerulaitis.

Seeds

  Adriano Panatta (quarterfinals)
  Guillermo Vilas (second round)
  Ilie Năstase (quarterfinals)
  Brian Gottfried (semifinals)
  Raúl Ramírez (second round)
  Manuel Orantes (withdrew) 
  Roscoe Tanner (first round)
  Vitas Gerulaitis (champion)
  Corrado Barazzutti (second round)
  Jan Kodeš (third round)
  Bill Scanlon (third round)
  Phil Dent (semifinals)
  Antonio Zugarelli (final)
  Balázs Taróczy (second round)
  Paolo Bertolucci (second round)
  Dick Crealy (second round)

Draw

Finals

Top half

Section 1

Section 2

Bottom half

Section 3

Section 4

References
General

Specific

1977 Italian Open (tennis)